Laurillard is a surname. Notable people with the surname include:

Alan Laurillard (born 1946), Canadian composer
Charles Léopold Laurillard (1783–1853), French zoologist, a student of Georges Cuvier and he made zoological illustrations for Cuvier
Edward Laurillard (1870–1936), cinema and theatre producer